The Tour Pey-Berland (Pey Berland Tower), named for its patron Pey Berland, is the separate bell tower of the Bordeaux Cathedral, in Bordeaux at the Place Pey Berland.

History 
Its construction was from 1440 to 1500 at the initiative of the archbishop of the same name. Crowned a steeple, it has remained isolated from the rest of the Cathedral to protect the cathedral from the vibrations of the bells.  After the completion, the church had initially no money for the purchase of bells, therefore the tower was used for housing until 1790.  After 1790, a lead factory was set up in the tower.  Bells were installed after 1851 and the tower began to be used for its original purpose.

Now open to the public, it's possible to walk up its 230 steps and have a panoramic view of Bordeaux.

Gallery

Notes

Religious buildings and structures completed in 1500
Towers completed in the 15th century
Buildings and structures in Bordeaux
Towers in France
Tourist attractions in Bordeaux
Monuments of the Centre des monuments nationaux